The Clausura 2016 Copa MX was the 75th staging of the Copa MX, the 48th staging in the professional era and is the eighth tournament played since the 1996–97 edition.

This tournament began on January 19, 2016 and ended on April 13, 2016. The winner faced the winner of the Apertura 2015 edition, Guadalajara in the 2016 Supercopa MX for the right to qualify as Mexico 3 to the 2017 Copa Libertadores.

Veracruz won their second title after defeating 4–1 Necaxa in the final.

Participants
This tournament featured clubs from Liga MX who did not participate in the 2015-16 CONCACAF Champions League (América, Querétaro, Santos Laguna and UANL) or the 2016 Copa Libertadores (UNAM, Toluca, Puebla). The top 13 Ascenso MX in the Apertura 2015 classification table also qualified to the tournament.

Tiebreakers

If two or more clubs are equal on points on completion of the group matches, the following criteria are applied to determine the rankings:

 superior goal difference;
 higher number of goals scored;
 scores of the group matches played among the clubs in question;
 higher number of goals scored away in the group matches played among the clubs in question;
 best position in the Relegation table;
 fair play ranking;
 drawing of lots.

Group stage

Every group is composed of four clubs, two from Liga MX and two from Ascenso MX. except for Group 6 which only has one Liga MX club. Instead of a traditional robin-round schedule, the clubs will play in three two-legged "rounds", the last one being contested by clubs of the same league.

Each win gives a club 3 points, each draw gives 1 point. An extra point is awarded for every round won; a round is won by aggregated score, and if it is a tie, the extra point will be awarded to the team with higher number of goals scored away.

All times are UTC−06:00 except for matches in Cancún (UTC−05:00), Ciudad Juárez, Sinaloa, Tepic (all UTC−07:00) and Tijuana (UTC−08:00)

Group 1

Round 1

UDG won the round 4–2 on aggregate

Teams drew 1–1 on aggregate and tied on away goals, thus neither team earned the extra point

Round 2

Juarez won the round 3–2 on aggregate

Guadalajara won the round 2–0 on aggregate

Round 3

Juárez won the round 2–1 on aggregate

Sinaloa won the round 2–0 on aggregate

Group 2

Round 1

Tijuana won the round 4–1 on aggregate

Tepic won the round 2–1 on aggregate

Round 2

Tepic won the round 4–3 on aggregate

Atlas won the round 4–2 on aggregate

Round 3

Tepic won the round 5–2 on aggregate

Tijuana won the round 6–3 on aggregate

Group 3

Round 1

Teams drew 1–1 on aggregate and tied on away goals, thus neither team earned the extra point

Pachuca won the round 3–2 on aggregate

Round 2

Pachuca won the round 3–2 on aggregate

Monterrey won the round 4–2 on aggregate

Round 3

Atlético San Luis won the round 6–2 on aggregate

Pachuca won the round 5–4 on aggregate

Group 4

Round 1

Zacatecas won the round 6–5 on aggregate

León won the round 6–4 on aggregate

Round 2

Zacatecas won the round 4–2 on aggregate

Necaxa won the round 5–0 on aggregate

Round 3

Necaxa won the round 4–3 on aggregate

Morelia won the round 7–4 on aggregate

Group 5

Round 1

Veracruz won the round 4–2 on aggregate

BUAP won the round 5–4 on aggregate

Round 2

Teams drew 0–0 on aggregate and tied on away goals, thus neither team earned the extra point

Oaxaca won the round 3–2 on aggregate

Round 3

Veracruz won the round 4–2 on aggregate

Oaxaca won the round 3–1 on aggregate

Group 6

Round 1

Teams drew 2–2 on aggregate and drew on away goals, thus neither team received the extra point

Teams drew 2–2 on aggregate, Cruz Azul won the round on away goals

Round 2

Venados won the round 3–1 on aggregate

Cruz Azul won the round 4–3 on aggregate

Round 3
                                                        

Atlante won the round 3–2 on aggregate

Cruz Azul won the round 7–3 on aggregate

Ranking of runners-up clubs

The best two runner-up advance to the Championship Stage. If two or more teams are equal on points on completion of the group matches, the following criteria are applied to determine the rankings:

 superior goal difference;
 higher number of goals scored;
 higher number of goals scored away;
 best position in the Relegation table;
 fair play ranking;
 drawing of lots.

Championship stage

The eight clubs that advance to this stage will be ranked and seeded 1 to 8 based on performance in the group stage. In case of ties, the same tiebreakers used to rank the runners-up will be used.
In this stage, all the rounds will be a one-off match. If a game ends in a draw, it will proceed directly to a penalty shoot-out. The highest seeded club will host each match, regardless of which division each club belongs.

Seeding

Bracket

Quarterfinals

Semifinals

Final

Top goalscorers
Players sorted first by goals scored, then by last name. 

Source: LaCopaMX.net

References

External links
Official site

2016, 1
Copa Mx, 1
Copa Mx, 1
Copa Mx, 1